Siemens Healthineers (formerly Siemens Healthcare, Siemens Medical Solutions, and Siemens Medical Systems) is a German medical device company. It is the parent company for several medical technology companies and is headquartered in Erlangen, Germany. The company dates its early beginnings in 1847 to a small family business in Berlin, co-founded by Werner von Siemens. Siemens Healthineers is 75% owned by Siemens. The name Siemens Medical Solutions was adopted in 2001, and the change to Siemens Healthcare was made in 2008. In 2015, Siemens named Bernd Montag as its new global CEO. In May 2016, the business operations of Siemens Healthcare were rebranded "Siemens Healthineers."

Globally, the companies owned by Siemens Healthineers have 65,000 employees.

History

19th century

The history of Siemens Healthineers started in Berlin in the mid-19th century as a part of what is now known as Siemens AG. Siemens & Halske was founded by Werner von Siemens and Johann Georg Halske on 12 October 1847.  The company formed around an invention created by Siemens called the pointer telegraph. Based on the telegraph, Werner von Siemens' new invention used a needle to point to the sequence of letters, instead of using Morse code.  The company, then called Telegraphen-Bauanstalt von Siemens & Halske, opened its first workshop on 12 October. Eventually, the new company included electrometrical equipment and specialized in medical technology.

Three years previously, in 1844, Werner von Siemens put one of his inventions to use for medical purposes for the first time, using electricity to treat his brother Friedrich for tooth pain. After teaming up with Halske, the new company's products included electromedical equipment. In Erlangen, Erwin Moritz Reiniger laid the cornerstone for Reiniger, Gebbert & Schall, a company specializing in medical technology.

In 1896, only one year after Wilhelm Conrad Röntgen discovered the X-ray, Siemens produced the first industrially manufactured X-ray tubes for medical diagnostics.

20th century

In Aschaffenburg, Germany, X-ray pioneer Friedrich Dessauer founded his own company, which later came to prominence under the name Veifa-Werke. The companies maintained close ties with each other, finally merging in 1932 to form Siemens-Reiniger-Werke (SRW). The company soon came to be viewed as the world's largest specialized electromedical company. Later, in 1933, Siemens introduced rotating anode tubes for X-rays that could withstand much greater electrical loads, laying the foundation for the development of modern X-ray tubes.

Supported by Siemens in Erlangen, Inge Edler, a Swedish physician, and physicist Carl Hellmuth Hertz were intrigued by the idea of using ultrasound technology to achieve more precise heart diagnoses. In 1953, they became the first to use the ultrasound technique for echocardiography. Today, this powerful ultrasound process is a standard component of all cardiovascular examinations.

In 1958, Elema-Schönander AB (subsequently Siemens-Elema AB) developed the first cardiac pacemaker implanted in a critically ill heart patient by surgeon Åke Senning.

Siemens engineer Ralph Soldner developed the world's first "real-time" ultrasound unit, the Vidoson, in the 1960s. With this technology, technicians could view movements inside the body on a screen right while they were taking place, a feature that became especially important in obstetrics and pediatrics.

The company released its first computed tomography scanner, the Siretom, in 1975, a year after it exhibited its first tomographic image of a human head at the annual meeting of the Radiological Society of North America in Chicago. A typical examination took less than six minutes. The skull is scanned from various directions by an X-ray tube and a detector unit, and an image of absorption distribution in the brain is generated in the computer.

The first magnetic resonance imaging (MRI) scanner, Siemens' MAGNETOM system, came to the market in 1983. With the aid of powerful magnetic fields, MRI scanners produce high-quality cross-sectional images without exposing patients to ionizing radiation.

In 1998, Siemens introduced the first track-based laboratory automation system, the ADVIA LabCell Automation Solution, allowing for increased efficiency and reduced costs.

Siemens imaging devices use the syngo image processing software developed by the company in 1999. The software provides a single user interface for a large number of imaging systems, integrating patient-specific physiological and imaging data into clinical workflows.

21st century

Siemens was the first to combine positron emission tomography (PET) with computed tomography (CT).  By creating this hybrid imaging system, Siemens combined the PET scanner's ability to visualize biological processes of life with a CT system's anatomical image of tissues and organs. In doing so, the combination system allows a simultaneous display of anatomy and biological function. Time magazine named the Siemens Biograph, the world's first commercial PET-CT scanner, the "Innovation of the Year" in 2000.

In a similar fashion, Siemens launched the Biograph mMR in 2010, the first scanner to completely combine MRI and PET technologies.  Like PET-CT, PET-MR hybrid systems combine multiple technologies to provide a better image of the body, enabling for better diagnoses, research and treatment plans for patients. It combines precise images of the body tissues from MRI with metabolic cell activity from PET.

In 2011, Siemens discontinued its linear accelerators for the treatment of cancer, citing cost pressures and a decision to focus on diagnostic imaging in cancer.

In May 2016, Siemens AG rebranded the healthcare division from Siemens Healthcare to Siemens Healthineers. The change reflected part of the Siemens AG Vision 2020 strategy announced nearly two years previously that its healthcare business would be separately managed as a company within the company with a new organizational setup. CEO Bernd Montag introduced the name along with a five-minute dance routine celebration outside the Healthineers headquarters in Erlangen. The routine was met with ridicule; the Financial Times called it a "Writhing spandex clad horror." Multiple outlets called the new logo similar to that of Fitbit and called the rebranding a failure at large. The name also led some people to believe that it was an article from The Onion. Montag later admitted that the dance routine was a mistake.

In November 2017 the company announced its intention to become publicly-listed on the Frankfurt Stock Exchange in March 2018.  A minority stake of up to 25% was expected to be sold at part of the IPO, which would be Germany's largest listing since the IPO of Deutsche Telekom in 1996. The first day of trading was 16 March 2018, with a 15% stake sold at an initial share price of €28.00.

Charitable activities
Siemens Healthineers has supported charitable giving around the world.  The company has supported such programs such as the American Society for Clinical Pathology's (ASCP) laboratory student scholarships, the PATH Ingenuity Fellows mentorship program, and others.

The company has also contributed to disaster relief efforts. In response to hurricane Katrina in 2005, Siemens Healthineers donated heart monitors and imaging equipment to Houston-area hospitals while parent company, Siemens AG, matched 100% of U.S. employee donations to the American Red Cross Disaster Relief Fund. After the 2010 earthquake in Haiti, Siemens Healthineers donated medical equipment to aid healthcare workers in their efforts to help victims. The company responded similarly in 2015 when a 7.8 magnitude earthquake struck Nepal. Siemens Healthineers provided the relief efforts with a magnetic resonance imaging machine in addition to the funds donated by Siemens AG.

Mergers and acquisitions
In 2005, Siemens Medical Solutions USA, Inc. acquired CTI Molecular Imaging for $1 billion (€750 million, $20.50 per share) incorporating it into its Advanced Imaging business.

In 2006, the business announced it would acquire Diagnostics Products Corporation for around $1.9 billion (€1.5 billion). Established in 1971, Diagnostics Products Corporation produced immunodiagnostics and supplies for fertility diagnosis and in-vitro allergy testing, with the business being incorporated into the Laboratory Diagnostics division post-deal. In the same year the company announced it would acquire Bayer's Diagnostics division, for €4.2 billion,  boosting the business's offerings in a range of services for in-vitro diagnosis.

In November 2007, Siemens announced it would further expand its laboratory diagnostics range, via the acquisition of Dade Behring, producer of clinical laboratory equipment and products for routine chemistry testing, immunodiagnostics (including infectious disease testing), hemostasis testing, and microbiology.

In November 2011 the business acquired MobileMD, later divesting the business in 2014 to Cerner for $1.3 billion (€970 million).

In September 2012 the company announced it would acquire Penrith Corporation, manufacturer of ultrasound imaging systems.

In November 2016, Siemens Healthineers (via Siemens Healthcare GmbH) acquired Conworx Technology GmbH, a Berlin-based developer of point-of-care device interfaces and data management solutions.

In May 2016, Siemens Healthineers expanded its molecular diagnostics portfolio with the acquisition of NEO New Oncology AG.

In April 2017, Siemens Healthineers expanded into radiological information systems with the acquisition of Medicalis Corporation.

In 2019, the business announced the acquisition of vascular robotics start-up, Corindus, for $1.1 billion (€980 million).

In August 2020, the business announced it would acquire Varian Medical Systems, for $16.4 billion (€13.9 billion), representing a return to radiation therapy after the discontinuation of Siemens' own linear accelerators in 2011.
After the merger Varian will continue to operate as an independent company and will retain its headquarters along with its 10,000 employees.

See also 
 List of assets owned by Siemens

References

Medical technology companies of Germany
2018 initial public offerings
Siemens
Erlangen
Medical and health organisations based in Bavaria
Companies listed on the Frankfurt Stock Exchange
Companies in the TecDAX
Companies in the MDAX